Red Wing station is a train station in Red Wing, Minnesota, United States, served by Amtrak's (the National Railroad Passenger Corporation) Empire Builder, which runs daily between Chicago and Seattle or Portland, Oregon. The next westbound stop is in Saint Paul, Minnesota and the next eastbound stop is in Winona, Minnesota.

Description 
The station is located at 420 Levee Street on the bank of the Mississippi River, south of the Levee Park and just across the river from Wisconsin. (Although the river lies northwest of the station, the depot is located on the west bank of the Mississippi.) The station is easily accessible from Main Street, via Broad Street, and is within one block of downtown Red Wing. There is an enclosed waiting room (with restrooms) available daily from 8:00 am to 9:45 pm, with a caretaker opening and closing the depot. No other services are provided at the station (i.e., baggage, lounge, telephone, ticketing, etc.). The tracks and platform of the station are owned by the Soo Line Railroad (a subsidiary of the Canadian Pacific Railway), while the depot building and parking lot are owned by the Red Wing Area Fund (also known as the Red Wing Property Conservation Fund).

History 
The depot was originally built by the Chicago, Milwaukee, St. Paul and Pacific Railroad (Milwaukee Road). The depot building also houses Red Wing Arts which features an art gallery and gift shop.

A plaque on the building states, "The construction of this building began in 1904 following an agreement in which the city of Red Wing provided trackage concessions and the railroad agreed to construct this depot and donate money toward construction of Levee Park. This building was designed by the railroad company architect, J.M. Nettenstrom, in a style influenced by the neoclassical revival of the 1893 Chicago Columbian Exposition." The building is a contributing property to the Red Wing Mall Historic District, which is on the National Register of Historic Places.

See also 
Chicago Great Western Depot

Notes

References

External links 

Red Wing Amtrak Station (USA Rail Guide -- Train Web)
Red Wing Sesquecentenial -- City History

Amtrak stations in Minnesota
Historic district contributing properties in Minnesota
Railway stations on the National Register of Historic Places in Minnesota
Railway stations in the United States opened in 1905
Red Wing, Minnesota
Transportation in Goodhue County, Minnesota
Red Wing, Minnesota
National Register of Historic Places in Goodhue County, Minnesota